American Reel is a 1999 drama film directed by Mark Archer and starring David Carradine, Michael Maloney, and Mariel Hemingway. Written by Junior Burke and Scott Fivelson, the film is set in Chicago, Illinois, though primary filming locations included Fort Wayne, Indiana, Waterloo, Indiana, and Hicksville, Ohio.

The film, which features Carradine singing five of his original songs, has been heralded as a "tailor-made" showcase of the late actor's little-known musical work.

Synopsis
Country singer James Lee Springer (Carradine) has just become an overnight sensation—after 20 years of trying to make it by playing every honky-tonk west (and east) of the Big Muddy. But after so many years of waiting and hoping, the only question is whether it's all worth it.

Cast
 David Carradine as James Lee Springer
 Michael Maloney as Jason Fields
 Mariel Hemingway as Disney Rifkin
 Marina Anderson as Commercial Director
 Larissa Borkowski as Natasha
 Troy Clark as James' Cousin
 Kevin Ferguson as Tony Marty
 Mike Leonardo as Music Video Director
 Melissa Long as Entertainment Reporter
 Willy T. Ribbs as Jason's Attorney
 Mark Schiff as Marvin Ayres
 Rebecca Shea as Legal Secretary
 Matt Socia as Blair Whiteman
 Carrie Wellman as Radio Interviewer (uncredited)

DVD
The DVD of the film was released in 2003 and contains interviews with the cast, and a behind the scenes gallery of photos. In 2012, the film was re-released and made available on streaming services such as Netflix and Amazon Prime Video.

Reprises
Though the film was initially released with little publicity, it has become appreciated by Carradine's more loyal fans, and has been screened multiple times since the actor's passing.

On December 8, 2011, Quentin Tarantino's New Beverly Cinema included the film in a double screening with Kill Bill: Volume 2 as part of an annual tribute to David Carradine and his work. The film was chosen because it helped highlight Carradine's little-known musical work, and the event included performances by the re-incarnation of Carradine's musical band "The Cosmic Rescue Team."
On September 7, 2012, the Los Angeles County Department of Parks and Recreation screened the film in Pershing Square in Downtown Los Angeles as part of the department's "Under the Sheet Music" outdoor film series.

See also
Cinema of the United States

References

External links
 
 
 

1999 films
1999 drama films
1990s English-language films
2000s English-language films
1990s American films
2000s American films
American drama films
Films shot in Indiana